Stewards Academy (formerly Stewards Schools) is an 11–16 mixed secondary school with academy status in Harlow, Essex, England.

References

External links 
 

Harlow
Secondary schools in Essex
Academies in Essex